is a 2008 Japanese film, based on the 2004 novel , written by Hikaru Murozumi. The film, directed by Ikki Katashima, stars Arata Furuta, Chiaki Kuriyama, Kosuke Toyohara, Shiro Sano, Narimi Arimori, and Shugo Oshinari.

Plot
Komori is an ordinary, middle-aged business executive who is fed up with people walking all over him. Neither his family nor his coworkers have any respect for him. One fateful day while riding the train, a woman falsely accuses him of groping her, causing Komori to have his first violent outburst. From that moment, he decides to wield his own brand of justice and becomes determined to free his community of crime. Soon afterwards, people begin to idolize him and his work.

Cast
 Arata Furuta as Komori
 Chiaki Kuriyama as Shizue

References

2008 films
2000s Japanese-language films
2000s Japanese films